Pseudomonas sRNA P24 is a ncRNA that was predicted using bioinformatic tools in the genome of the opportunistic pathogen Pseudomonas aeruginosa and its expression verified by northern blot analysis.

P24 is conserved across several Pseudomonas species and is consistently located between a hypothetical protein gene and a transcriptional regulator gene (AsnC family) in the genomes of these Pseudomonas species.  P24 has a predicted Rho independent terminatorat the 3′ end but the function of P24 is unknown.

See also

Pseudomonas sRNA P9
Pseudomonas sRNA P11
Pseudomonas sRNA P15
Pseudomonas sRNA P16
Pseudomonas sRNA P26

References

External links
 

Non-coding RNA